Sandwich wrap may refer to:

 Plastic wrap or wax paper used to wrap sandwiches.
 Wrap (sandwich), a kind of sandwich made by rolling flatbread around a filling.